Transformers Prime Beast Hunters: Predacons Rising is a 2013 American computer animated action adventure television film that concludes the Transformers: Prime television series. It was first broadcast on Hub Network on October 4, 2013. After the Autobots' victory on Earth, Unicron returns in possession of Megatron's body with the intent on destroying Cybertron, forcing Autobots, Decepticons, and Predacons to form an unlikely alliance to counter this threat.

Plot
Not long after Megatron's demise and the restoration of Cybertron, the Autobots celebrate as Optimus Prime knights Bumblebee a warrior. Optimus and Wheeljack embark on a journey to find the AllSpark, the source of Cybertronian life, leaving the other Autobots to hunt down the missing Decepticons Shockwave and Starscream. Meanwhile, at the bottom of Earth's ocean, Megatron is revived and possessed by Unicron, intending to destroy Cybertron. While searching for Shockwave and Starscream, Ultra Magnus and Smokescreen are attacked by their Predacon creations Skylynx and Darksteel, forcing Ratchet to return to Cybertron to treat their wounds.

Bumblebee, Smokescreen, Bulkhead, and Arcee track down Predaking in an attempt to find the new Predacons, but Predaking refuses to help them. After Bumblebee's team heads to Megatron's old fortress in Kaon on the imprisoned Knock Out's suggestion, they are confronted by Unicron and are forced to escape. Meanwhile, in the Theta Scorpii asteroid belt, Optimus and Wheeljack find the AllSpark's container. Despite an oncoming plasma storm that damages Wheeljack's ship, Optimus retrieves the container and begins returning to Cybertron. With Ultra Magnus wounded in action and Optimus unable to communicate with them, Bumblebee assumes temporary leadership of the Autobots.

Predaking begins searching for Skylynx and Darksteel, but finds Unicron instead. After easily defeating him, Unicron encounters Shockwave, Starscream, Darksteel, and Skylynx harvesting bones from a massive Predacon graveyard. Unicron overpowers Skylynx and Darksteel and resurrects the ancient corpses into undead Terrorcons; Starscream flees and Shockwave is seemingly killed by the Terrorcons. As the undead horde heads for the Well of All Sparks, the Autobots prepare to fight back while Ratchet stays behind with Ultra Magnus. Starscream sneaks on board the Nemesis and frees Knock Out and the captive Vehicon troops, but Knock Out defects and incapacitates Starscream before he can commandeer the ship and flee Cybertron. Predaking finds Skylynx and Darksteel at the Predacon graveyard, and the resulting brawl is interrupted by a wounded Shockwave, who suggests that they assist the Autobots. Unicron's undead army is confronted by the Nemesis and the Predacons at the Well of AllSpark, but the ship is shot down and Starscream escapes.

Optimus and Wheeljack return, but Unicron shoots down Wheeljack's ship, defeats Optimus, and seemingly claims the AllSpark. However, his Anti-Spark is pulled into the empty container, sealing it away forever. The Terrorcons disintegrate and Megatron is freed. Having a change of heart, Megatron disbands the Decepticons and leaves to start anew. Starscream tries to take command of the Decepticons only to be confronted by a vengeful Predaking, Skylynx, and Darksteel.

Optimus reveals that he emptied the AllSpark into the Matrix of Leadership within him, but can no longer be separated from either and must sacrifice himself to restore life to Cybertron. The Autobots try to dissuade him, but Optimus states that the Matrix cannot be restored again and asks that they continue to protect Cybertron. As the others vow to keep the peace and Optimus plunges into the planet's core, millions of sparks from deceased and unborn Transformers emerge from the Well. The Autobots watch as Optimus's spark joins the multitude among the Well, while he narrates that his sacrifice marks a new beginning rather than the end – "simply put, another transformation".

Cast
 Peter Cullen – Optimus Prime
 Sumalee Montano – Arcee
 Nolan North – Smokescreen & Skylynx
 Kevin Michael Richardson – Bulkhead
 Will Friedle – Bumblebee
 Daran Norris – Knock Out
 Frank Welker – Megatron & Terrorcons
 James Horan – Wheeljack
 Steve Blum – Starscream & Darksteel
 Peter Mensah – Predaking
 David Sobolov – Shockwave
 John Noble – Unicron
 Jeffrey Combs – Ratchet
 Michael Ironside – Ultra Magnus

Reception
Predacons Rising earned positive reviews with it being called a satisfying conclusion to the series but some criticized the under-use of some characters.

Crew
 Jamie Simone – Casting and Voice Director

References

External links

 

2013 computer-animated films
2013 television films
2013 films
2010s action adventure films
2010s science fiction films
American action adventure films
American television films
American children's animated adventure films
American children's animated science fantasy films
Films scored by Brian Tyler
Prime Beast Hunters: Predacons Rising
Films with screenplays by Duane Capizzi
2010s American films